The lumboinguinal nerve, also known as the femoral or crural branch of genitofemoral, is a nerve in the abdomen. The lumboinguinal nerve is a branch of the genitofemoral nerve. The "femoral" part supplies skin to the femoral triangle area.

Structure
The lumboinguinal nerve arises from the genitofemoral nerve. It descends alongside the external iliac artery, sending a few filaments around it, and, passing beneath the inguinal ligament, enters the sheath of the femoral vessels, lying superficial and lateral to the femoral artery. Here, it pierces the anterior layer of the sheath of the vessels and the fascia lata, and supplies the skin of the anterior surface of the upper part of the thigh.  

On the front of the thigh it communicates with the anterior cutaneous branches of the femoral nerve.

A few filaments from the lumboinguinal nerve may be traced to the femoral artery.

Additional images

See also

 Genitofemoral nerve

External links
 Photo of model at Waynesburg College

References

Nerves of the lower limb and lower torso